The team jumping in equestrian at the 2012 Olympic Games in London was held at Greenwich Park from 4 to 6 August.

Great Britain's team consisting of Scott Brash, Peter Charles, Ben Maher and Nick Skelton won the gold medal in a jump-off, the first win in the event for Great Britain since 1952. The Netherlands won silver and Saudi Arabia took bronze — the only medal of the 2012 Games for the latter.

Competition format 
Five rounds of jumping were conducted in total. The second and third rounds were used for the team jumping event. Final rankings were based on the sum of scores of the three best riders from both rounds. A jump-off would be held to break a tie for any of the medal positions.

Schedule 
All times are British Summer Time (UTC+1)

Participants

Medalists

References 

Team jumping